The election for the Hong Kong deputies to the 11th National People's Congress (NPC) was held on 25 January 2008. 36 Hong Kong deputies were elected by an electoral college composed of 1,234 members.

Background
Article 21 of the Hong Kong Basic Law stipulates:

Chinese citizens who are residents of the Hong Kong Special Administrative Region shall be entitled to participate in the management of state affairs according to law.

In accordance with the assigned number of seats and the selection method specified by the National People's Congress, the Chinese citizens among the residents of the Hong Kong Special Administrative Region shall locally elect deputies of the Region to the National People's Congress to participate in the work of the highest organ of state power.

A 1,234-strong electoral college composed of the following:
 Members of the previous electoral college that had elected the Hong Kong deputies to the 10th National People's Congress;
 Hong Kong delegates of the 10th Chinese People's Political Consultative Committee (CPPCC);
 Members of the Election Committee (which elects the Chief Executive) who are Chinese nationals, except those who opt out; and
 The Chief Executive of the HKSAR.

Overview
The election took place at the second plenary meeting of the 11th National People's Congress election meeting on 25 January. It was attended by National People's Congress Standing Committee (NPCSC) vice-chairman Sheng Huaren and presided by Chief Executive Donald Tsang Yam-kuen as executive chairman of the 19-member presidium.
 
9 incumbent delegates decided to step down including Allen Lee Peng-fei, Tsang Tak-sing, Sik Chi-wai and Tsang Hin-chi and member of the NPCSC Ng Hong-mun. It attracted new faces such as Executive Councillors Laura Cha Shih May-lung and Bernard Charnwut Chan, chairman of the Chinese General Chamber of Commerce Ian Fok Chun-wan, former chairman of the Kowloon-Canton Railway Michael Tien Puk-sun and former Secretary for Education and Manpower Fanny Law Fan Chiu-fun. There were also three pan-democrats, James To Kun-sun and Mak Hoi-wah of the Democratic Party and Frederick Fung Kin-kee of the Association for Democracy and People's Livelihood.

1,169 of the 1,234 electoral college members cast their votes. Each elector had to choose 36 candidates. The top 36 candidates in the ballot, as long as they receive more than 50 per cent support, would be elected. 36 of the 52 candidates were elected while 7 candidates were elected as supplementary deputies. 2 incumbents, Philip Wong Yu-hong and David Chu Yu-lin failed to retain their seats in surprise.

Election result

Elected members (36)

 Laura Cha Shih May-lung
 Bernard Charnwut Chan
 Cheng Yiu-tong
 Choy So-yuk
 Rita Fan Hsu Lai-tai
 Fei Fih
 Ian Fok Chun-wan
 Raymond Ho Chung-tai
 Ip Kwok-him
 Ko Po-ling
 Dennis Lam Shun-chiu
 Fanny Law Fan Chiu-fun
 Joseph Lee Chung-tak
 Miriam Lau Kin-yee
 Priscilla Lau Pui-king
 Sophie Leung Lau Yau-fun
 Leung Ping-chung
 Martin Liao Cheung-kong
 Lo Shun-on
 Lo Suk-ching
 Tim Lui Tim-leung
 Ma Fung-kwok
 Ma Ho-fai
 Ng Ching-fai
 Ng Leung-sing
 Maria Tam Wai-chu
 Michael Tien Puk-sun
 Tso Wung-wai
 Wang Rudeng
 Carson Wen Ka-shuen
 Wong Kwok-kin
 Peter Wong Man-kong
 Wilfred Wong Ying-wai
 Wong Yuk-shan
 Yeung Yiu-chung
 Yuen Mo

Supplementary members (4)

 David Chu Yu-lin
 Peter Hung Hak-hip
 Leung Fu-wah
 Philip Wong Yu-hong

References

2008 elections in China
2008 in Hong Kong
NPC
January 2008 events in China